Senator Bacon may refer to:

Augustus Octavius Bacon (1839–1914), U.S. Senator from Georgia
Bob Bacon (born 1935), Colorado State Senate
Gaspar G. Bacon (1886–1947), Massachusetts State Senate
John Bacon (Massachusetts politician) (1738–1820), Massachusetts State Senate
Kevin Bacon (politician) (born 1971), Ohio State Senate
Orrin Bacon (1820–1893), Wisconsin State Senate
Robert Bacon (Iowa politician) (born 1955), Iowa State Senate